Trevor Taylor is a Canadian politician. He formerly represented the riding of The Straits - White Bay North in the Newfoundland and Labrador House of Assembly. He was a member of the Progressive Conservatives.

Prior to entering politics, Taylor worked as a fisherman, and later staff member of the FFAW (fishermens' union).

He has served as Minister of Transportation and Works, Minister of Innovation, Trade and Rural Development, and Acting Minister of Fisheries & Aquaculture (a post he held after the 2003 provincial election).

On September 24, 2009, Taylor announced that he had resigned as Minister of Transportation and Works, and that on October 2, 2009, he would resign as an MHA. He told reporters he was leaving for personal reasons, that he still fully supported the government of Danny Williams, and was not leaving because of any internal conflict.

In March 2011, with the announcement of a federal election, Taylor was nominated to represent the Conservative Party of Canada in Humber—St. Barbe—Baie Verte. He was defeated by incumbent Liberal MP Gerry Byrne, receiving 7,519 votes. Taylor had previously challenged Byrne, unsuccessfully contesting the riding as a New Democrat during the 2000 federal election receiving 8,173 votes.

Electoral record

|Liberal
|Boyd Noel
|align="right"|1,358
|align="right"|32.49%
|align="right"|-3.46%

|NDP
|Gerry Ryall
|align="right"|171
|align="right"|4.09%
|align="right"|+2.53%
|}

|Liberal
|Don McDonald
|align="right"|1802
|align="right"|35.95%
|align="right"|

|Independent
|Ford Michelmore
|align="right"|78
|align="right"|1.56%
|align="right"|
|}

References

Newfoundland and Labrador candidates for Member of Parliament
Living people
Progressive Conservative Party of Newfoundland and Labrador MHAs
New Democratic Party candidates for the Canadian House of Commons
Conservative Party of Canada candidates for the Canadian House of Commons
Year of birth missing (living people)